Wissol Petroleum is a daughter brand of Wissol Group, one of the largest retailer business groups in Georgia.

This Georgian oil company is operating the widest network of service stations in the country and runs over 100 petroleum stations, nowadays providing services and products in every district of Tbilisi and elsewhere in the country. Further development of the network is underway.

Established in 2000, the company completed its process of re-branding in 2005 and entered the market with the name Wissol. In addition to individual customers, more than 6000 corporate clients use Wissol's services.

The company imports the Italian fuel from api and petroleum products from other European counties as well. In 2010, Wissol Petroleum signed an agreement with Total, one of the world's major oil and gas groups based in France and became an exclusive importer of automobile oils and lubricants of Total in Georgia.

The company pioneered the Wissol Business Card for the company’s corporate clients to the Georgian market in 2001 and remains the only company in the sector providing such a system based on smart technology and in-house developed software. Compressed natural gas (CNG) is available at Wissol since September, 2007. JSC Wissol petroleum Georgia is the only oil company that pioneered the integrated service stations on the Georgian market.

See also

 Energy in Georgia (country)

External links
 Official  Wissol Petroleum website

Oil and gas companies of Georgia (country)
Companies based in Tbilisi
Energy companies established in 2000
Non-renewable resource companies established in 2000
2000 establishments in Georgia (country)